The Welrod is a British bolt action, magazine fed, suppressed pistol devised during the Second World War by Major Hugh Reeves at the Inter-Services Research Bureau (later Station IX). Station IX, being based near Welwyn Garden City, gave the Welrod its unusual name, being derived from "Wel" from "Welwyn Garden City" (a prefix used by covert equipment designed by Station IX) and "rod", gangland slang for gun, as a way to obscure its purpose.

Designed for use by irregular forces and resistance groups, the Welrod is an extremely quiet gun thanks to its integrated suppressor. Approximately 2,800 were made in wartime and perhaps 14,000 in total when post-war examples are included.

Development 

The name Welrod comes from the custom of naming all clandestine equipment devised  at Station IX in Welwyn Garden City starting with Wel, e.g., Welbike, Welman. A document produced towards the end of the war ensured that the right people were properly credited for their inventions at Station IX. This document reveals that the inventor of the Welrod was Major Hugh Reeves. He was also responsible for other important designs, including the sleeve gun, which was similar to the Welrod, though single shot and made to conceal up a sleeve.

The Welrod was used primarily by the British Special Operations Executive (SOE) but was also used by the American Office of Strategic Services (OSS) and Resistance forces.

The Welrod was a "sanitised" weapon, meaning that it had no markings indicating its manufacturer or country of origin; it was marked only with a serial number and some inscrutable symbols and letters. The Birmingham Small Arms Company Limited (BSA) confirmed that they manufactured some Welrod pistols but that they put no markings at all on them, so it is likely that any markings were added by the British military after delivery.

The original model was the Welrod Mk II, chambered for .32 ACP. This was the primary model. Due to poor field results, the Welrod Mk I was subsequently developed using 9×19mm Parabellum rounds.

Design 

The rear section of the cylinder contains the bolt, the middle section, the vented (16–20 ports) barrel and expansion chamber for the barrel and the front section, the baffles (rubber) and wipes of the suppressor. There is a knurled knob at the rear that serves as the bolt handle, which unlocks when rotated 90 degrees. The magazine is also the grip and can be removed for ease of hiding. The exclusion of a pistol grip was apparently done to help conceal the weapon's purpose and in some groups it was called a "bicycle pump" due to its innocuous look with the magazine/grip removed.

The Welrod is provided with sights marked with luminescent paint for use in low light conditions. The muzzle end of the gun is ground slightly concave to minimise noise during a contact shot; this may have also improved grip against the target, decreasing the chance of missing.

The ported barrel of the Welrod serves two purposes, it releases the powder gases gradually into the rear of the suppressor, reducing the sound of firing and it reduces the velocity of the bullet to subsonic speeds (especially important in the 9 mm version since the standard 9 mm loading is supersonic). The metal baffles and rubber wipes that follow the barrel serve to further slow the gases of firing, releasing them over a longer period of time and avoiding the sharp explosion that occurs when high pressure powder gases are suddenly released to the atmosphere.

The Welrod uses a bolt-action design because it is simple, reliable and quiet. The bolt-action has only the noise of the firing pin hitting the primer, and the bolt can be cycled quietly. Magazines of six and eight rounds were produced.

Operation 

The pistol is manually operated using a rotary bolt, locking with two lugs.  Loading is performed with a pull/push action using the round knurled knob to the rear of the weapon. The trigger is single stage with a simple safety at the back of the magazine housing. The detachable single stack magazine contains six or eight rounds (depending on calibre) and serves as a pistol grip with the bottom part enclosed by the plastic cover.

In 2002, Small Arms Review tested the Welrod (in .32 ACP) and found a 34-decibel noise reduction compared to a control pistol with a same length (3.25 inch) barrel for a final 122.8 decibel value. Earlier sound measurements did not meet the standards in place in 2002. According to Small Arms Review, the lower earlier measurements were ‘Undoubtedly […] a function of the available measuring equipment (including excessive meter rise time)’. A fully refurbished Welrod sounds quieter than a CO2 pellet pistol, with Philip H. Dater calling it ‘Hollywood quiet’. The Welrod's sound is almost imperceptible at 15 feet in a quiet environment and it would be inaudible to the operator in a noisy environment were the muzzle in contact with the target.

Use 

There was a plan in 1943 to drop Welrods into German-occupied territories for the mass assassination of Schutzstaffel (SS) and Gestapo officers and soldiers within a one-month period by resistance units.  This plan was possibly delayed or called off in the aftermath of Operation Anthropoid, the assassination of Reinhard Heydrich by Czech resistance forces.  In the wake of his assassination, an estimated 13,000 civilians were arrested and interrogated, 5,000 civilians murdered in German reprisal killings and the villages of Lidice and Ležáky destroyed.

The Welrod was used in Denmark during the war as well as being dropped in several other countries and is reported to have been used during the 1982 Falklands War, throughout The Troubles in Northern Ireland and during operation Desert Storm by British Special Forces. Welrod guns were also found in weapons caches from Operation Gladio. The Welrod was also used by US Army Special Forces soldiers assigned to Detachment 'A' Berlin during the Cold War and by MACVSOG

See also 
 Brügger & Thomet VP9
 De Lisle carbine
 Insurgency weapon

References

External links 
  Forgotten Weapons

 A Danish site with research into the production and use of the Welrod

Pistols
Pistols of the United Kingdom
Silenced firearms
Special Operations Executive
World War II infantry weapons of the United Kingdom
Weapons and ammunition introduced in 1942